Oliver Dulić (born 21 January 1975) is a Serbian politician, long-time member of Democratic Party, and former President of the National Assembly of Serbia between 2007 and 2008. He also served as Minister of Environment, Mining and Spatial Planning in the Government of Serbia.

Biography
Dulić was born in Belgrade, SFR Yugoslavia and completed primary and secondary education in Subotica, and graduated from the Belgrade Medical School in 1999, where he entered the postgraduate studies. He also completed the specialization on the University of Oslo. As of 2007, he was specializing orthopedic surgery and traumatology at the University of Belgrade. From October 2012, he is studying for his PhD at the University of Belgrade Faculty of Medicine, Banjica Institute for Orthopedic Surgical Diseases. His scientific focus is on surgical techniques for cartilage repair, regenerative medicine and stem cells.

He entered political life in 1996, when he was one of leaders of the students protest in Belgrade, and a member of his Initiative board, and later Otpor! movement, as well as a member of the Serbian Renewal Movement. He joined the Democratic Party in 1997. He was the president of the party's local board in Subotica in two terms. From 2000 to 2006 he was vice-president of Provincial Board of DS in Vojvodina. He is also a member of the party's Main committee. From 2001 to 2003 Dulić was head of North Bačka District. In 2003, he was an MP of the Parliament of Serbia and Montenegro. On local elections 2003, he was beaten by Géza Kucsera by just a hundred votes From 2006, he is a member of Presidency of Democratic Party.

Dulić was elected for the President of the Serbian Parliament on 23 May 2007. He was supported by 136 deputies of newly formed ruling coalition of Democratic Party, Democratic Party of Serbia and G17 Plus, as well as by votes of "Vojvodina deputies" and national minorities deputy clubs. His election ended the long-lasting institutional crisis which followed the 2007 elections. He succeeded the speaker position from Tomislav Nikolić of Serbian Radical Party, whose presidency lasted only 5 days, as result of a strange manoeuver within the ruling coalition through negotiations. At 32, he is the youngest speaker in the history of Serbian parliament.

Personal
Dulić is the younger brother of Modest Dulić. He is married and has a daughter. In addition to Serbian, he speaks fluent English,  Norwegian, and German. He also completed music school in Subotica, and plays guitar, piano, and tamburitza. He was an active waterpolo player and played for 15 years for the Subotica warterpolo club. He owns a small private company for computer dealing in Subotica.

Coming from a mixed marriage, Dulić is of partial Serb and partial Bunjevac origin. In an interview to Croatian Nova TV, he stated that he self-identifies as Yugoslav.

Criminal charges 
In late 2012, Dulić was charged by Organized Crime Prosecution of Serbia with abuse of office, on suspicion that he allowed an optic cable company Nuba Invest from Slovenia, owned by Rasto Tomažič to illegally obtain financial gain. The National Assembly of Serbia voted to lift his MP immunity that protected him from arrest and prosecution. He declared it to be an attack of new Government against its political opponents. In December 2012, Special Court rejected all accusations against Dulic.

Following the change of Democratic Party's leadership, new leader Dragan Đilas called on "all ministers in the previous government" to resign from Parliament and Dulić resigned on 30 November 2012.
He was elected for the Member of Democratic Party Presidency on 2 December 2012.

References

External links 

 

1975 births
Living people
Politicians from Belgrade
Serbian people of Croatian descent
Democratic Party (Serbia) politicians
Presidents of the National Assembly (Serbia)
Government ministers of Serbia
Politicians of Vojvodina
Politicians from Subotica
University of Belgrade Faculty of Medicine alumni